Skratch 'N Sniff is a nationally syndicated American radio program.  Hosted by radio imaging producer Malcolm Ryker and DJ Mike Czech, the weekly show mixes rock and hip-hop music for affiliates across the U.S., Canada, and Mexico.

History
The show first began on March 9, 2003 at San Diego rock station XETRA-FM (91.1 FM, "91X").  Rock-oriented Ryker had contacted hip-hop DJ Mike Czech, then at San Diego pop station XHITZ-FM (90.3 FM, "Z90"), with the idea of combining their respective formats in a blended mashup show.  By 2007, the show was airing on nearly 30 rock alternative rock and even a few Rock leaning Contemporary hits radio stations; Westwood One, the radio network acquired by Dial Global, began syndication of Skratch 'N Sniff that same year.  In 2008, the show expanded from one to two hours in most markets.  Compass Media Networks took over syndication of Skratch 'N Sniff in 2012.

Current status
Today the show serves nearly 60 affiliates, including stations in Washington, D.C. (WWDC (FM)), Detroit, Atlanta's 105.7 Saturday nights and Tampa.  In recent years, Skratch 'N Sniff has also offered limited content to non-market affiliates from the show's annual Halloween special.

References

External links

Compass Media Networks show page

American music radio programs
Rock music radio programs
Hip hop music radio programs